Events in the year 2018 in Myanmar.

Incumbents 
 President: Htin Kyaw (until March 21), Win Myint (starting March 30)
 State Counsellor: Aung San Suu Kyi
 First Vice President: Myint Swe 
 Second Vice President: Henry Van Thio

Events

January 
 5 January – A military convoy was ambushed in Turaing, Rakhine State, by the Arakan Rohingya Salvation Army. Seven people were wounded.
 16 January – Rakhine protesters rioted near a government building in the town of Mrauk U, in Rakhine State, Myanmar, after a ban was issued by local authorities on an event that commemorated the anniversary of the Kingdom of Mrauk U's dissolution. In response to protesters attempting to seize the government building, police fired live ammunition into the crowd, killing seven and wounding twelve.

February 
 21 February – a bomb exploded between two banks in Lashio, Shan State, killing two employees of Yoma Bank and injuring 22 others.
 24 February – three bombs exploded around Sittwe, the capital of Rakhine State, injuring two people.

March 
 21 March – Htin Kyaw resigned from his position as President of Myanmar due to ill health.
 21 March – Myint Swe became the Acting President of Myanmar.
 30 March – Win Myint became the 10th President of Myanmar.

Deaths 

 2 January – Yell Htwe Aung, comedian, actor, and model (b. 1993)
 5 April – Saw O Moo, environmental activist (b. 1975)
 13 October – U Thuzana, Theravada Buddhist monk and leader of the DKBA (b. 1947)

References 

 
2010s in Myanmar
Years of the 21st century in Myanmar
Myanmar
Myanmar